Arnold Wolff (26 July 1932 – 24 December 2019) was a German architect. From 1986 to 1997, he was academic teacher for restoration and conservation at the Cologne University of Applied Sciences.

Life 
Already in his childhood and youth he was interested in historical buildings. After one semester of teacher training at the Pädagogische Akademie in Cologne, Wolff studied architecture at the RWTH Aachen from November 1954, where he graduated in autumn 1961.

At the RWTH, the Cologne master builder Willy Weyres, who had a teaching assignment in Aachen, became aware of the student Wolff. In 1968, Wolff received his doctorate from the RWTH with a dissertation on the first construction period of the Gothic cathedral. With this work, he set new standards in the field of medieval architectural archaeology; its essential results are still current today and form the basis of every building history of architectural history of the Cologne Cathedral.
During these years, not only were the cathedral archives reorganised, but also the Dombauhütte Köln was rebuilt and the in-house "Verlag Kölner Dom" was founded. In addition to the immense restoration and conservation work on the cathedral, a new appreciation of the artistic achievement of the 19th century also took place under his leadership. This primarily concerns the reinstatement of the large west window by Carl Julius Milde, which was created in the years from 1865 to 1870 and was expanded but damaged in the Second World War.

In 1986, the state government of North Rhine-Westphalia appointed him professor. He taught at the Cologne University of Applied Sciences in the Department of Restoration and Conservation. Wolff also worked as an author and editor for the scientific research and popularity of Cologne Cathedral.

Wolff was married to Gerta Ramjoue (1935-2018), author of the city and museum guide Das römisch-germanische Köln (1981), which was published several times. They had three daughters and a son.

In 2002, on the occasion of his 70th birthday, the Dombauhütte honoured Wolff by creating a gargoyle on Cologne Cathedral in the shape of a wolf wearing a bow tie and a Wolf Lewis - three allusions to Wolff.

Wolff died in Heiligabend aged 87 and was buried in Cologne's Melaten cemetery on 11 January 2020.

Awards 
 1998: .
 1998: Komtur of the Order of St. Gregory the Great.
 2004: Order of Merit of North Rhine-Westphalia.
 2012: Honorary membership of the

Publications 
 Chronologie der ersten Bauzeit des Kölner Domes 1248–1277. Dissertation, vol.. 28/29 (1968) , .
 Der Dom zu Köln. Bearbeitet und ergänzt von Barbara Schock-Werner. Greven, Köln 2015, .
 Das Chormosaik im Kölner Dom (Meisterwerke des Kölner Domes, Band 11). Verlag Kölner Dom, Cologne 2012,.
 Arnold Wolff (ed.): Sulpiz Boisserée. Der Briefwechsel mit Moller, Schinkel and Zwirner. Verlag Kölner Dom, Greven, Cologne 2008, .

References

Further reading 
 Barbara Schock-Werner: Verabschiedung von Dombaumeister Prof. Dr. Arnold Wolff.
 : Domskizzen. Einführung und Kommentare zu den Bildern von Arnold Wolff. Verlag Ferger, Bergisch Gladbach 1998, Bildband.

External links 
 
 
 
 

20th-century German architects
21st-century German architects
Academic staff of the Technical University of Cologne
Knights Commander of the Order of St Gregory the Great
Members of the Order of Merit of North Rhine-Westphalia
1932 births
2019 deaths
People from Rhein-Kreis Neuss
RWTH Aachen University alumni